Ruoščiai is a small village in Kėdainiai district municipality, Lithuania. Located about 3 km from Dotnuva, it had 37 residents according to the 2011 census. The settlement is known as the geographical center of Lithuania, which was calculated in 1995.

Demography

References

Villages in Kaunas County
Geographical centres